American-Canadian actor Brendan Fraser had his film debut in the 1991 period coming-of-age drama film Dogfight. He went on to star in numerous films including the comedy film Encino Man with Sean Astin and Pauly Shore (1992), drama film School Ties with Chris O'Donnell (1992), comedy-drama film With Honors with Joe Pesci (1994), comedy film Airheads with Adam Sandler and Steve Buscemi (1994), psychological horror drama The Passion of Darkly Noon with Viggo Mortensen (1995), comedy film George of the Jungle with Leslie Mann (1997), period drama Gods and Monsters with Ian McKellen (1998), slapstick comedy Dudley Do-Right with Sarah Jessica Parker (1999), and romantic comedy-drama fantasy Blast from the Past with Alicia Silverstone (1999). Also in 1999, he starred as Rick O'Connell in the action-adventure film The Mummy opposite Rachel Weisz. He reprised the role in the 2001 sequel The Mummy Returns and in the third and final installment in The Mummy trilogy, The Mummy: Tomb of the Dragon Emperor (2008).

During the 2000s, Fraser starred in a wide array of genres, including the fantasy romantic comedy film Bedazzled with Elizabeth Hurley (2000), black comedy fantasy film Monkeybone with Bridget Fonda (2001), romantic drama thriller film The Quiet American with Michael Caine (2002), live-action/animated comedy film Looney Tunes: Back in Action with Jenna Elfman (2003), crime drama film Crash with Sandra Bullock (2004), independent crime thriller film Journey to the End of the Night with Mos Def (2006), science fantasy action-adventure film Journey to the Center of the Earth with Josh Hutcherson (2008), fantasy adventure film Inkheart with Paul Bettany (2008) and family black comedy film Furry Vengeance with Brooke Shields (2010). He's also starred in the medical drama film Extraordinary Measures with Harrison Ford (2010), neo-noir period crime thriller No Sudden Move with Benicio del Toro (2021), and Darren Aronofsky's psychological drama film The Whale with Sadie Sink (2022). For his role in The Whale, he won the Academy Award for Best Actor, the first Canadian actor to do so.

Fraser's television work includes the miniseries Texas Rising (2015), the Showtime drama series The Affair (2016–2017), the FX anthology series Trust (2018), the Epix series Condor (2018), and the DC Universe / HBO Max action series Doom Patrol (2019–present).

Film

Television

Video game

References

External links 

Male actor filmographies
American filmographies